Edward Peter McManaman (May 3, 1900 – July 18, 1964) was a bishop of the Catholic Church in the United States. He served as an auxiliary bishop of the Diocese of Erie from 1948 to 1964.

Biography
Born in Wilkes-Barre, Pennsylvania, McManaman studied for the priesthood at the Pontifical North American College in Rome and was ordained a priest there on March 12, 1927.  As a priest he served in parish ministry and as the diocesan superintendent of schools.  He was named a domestic prelate with the title Monsignor on May 24, 1947.

On July 24, 1948 Pope Pius XII appointed McManaman as the Titular Bishop of Floriana and Auxiliary Bishop of Erie.  He was consecrated a bishop in St. Peter's Cathedral in Erie by Bishop John M. Gannon on October 28, 1948. The principal co-consecrators were Bishops William J. Hafey of Scranton and William T. McCarty, C.Ss.R. of Rapid City.

McManaman served as auxiliary bishop until his death on July 18, 1964, at the age of 64.

References

1900 births
1964 deaths
People from Wilkes-Barre, Pennsylvania
Pontifical North American College alumni
Roman Catholic bishops of Erie
20th-century American Roman Catholic titular bishops
American Roman Catholic clergy of Irish descent